The 2019 Currie Cup First Division – known as the Currie Cup sponsored by DirectAxis Financial Services for sponsorship reasons – was the second tier of the Currie Cup, the premier domestic rugby union competition in South Africa. It was the 81st edition of the competition organised by the South African Rugby Union and was played between 6 July and 31 August 2019.

Competition rules and information

There were eight participating teams in the 2019 Currie Cup First Division. They played each other once during the pool stage, either at home or away. Teams received four points for a win and two points for a draw. Bonus points were awarded to teams that scored four or more tries in a game, as well as to teams that lost a match by seven points or less. Teams were ranked by log points, then points difference (points scored less points conceded).

The top four teams in the pool stage qualified for the semifinals, which were followed by a final.

Teams

The teams that competed in the 2019 Currie Cup First Division are:

Regular season

Standings

The current standings in the 2019 Currie Cup First Division is:

Round-by-round

The table below shows each team's progression throughout the season. For each round, each team's cumulative points total is shown with the overall log position in brackets.

Matches

The following matches were played in the 2019 Currie Cup First Division:

Round One

Round Two

Round Three

Round Four

Round Five

Round Six

Round Seven

Play-offs

Title play-offs

Semi-finals

Final

Promotion play-off

Honours

The honour roll for the 2019 Currie Cup First Division was:

Players

The squads and player appearance and scoring statistics for the 2019 Currie Cup First Division are as follows:

(c) denotes the team captain. For each match, the player's squad number is shown. Starting players are numbered 1 to 15, while the replacements are numbered 16 to 23. "App" refers to the number of appearances made by the player, "Try" to the number of tries scored by the player, "Con" to the number of conversions kicked, "Pen" to the number of penalties kicked, "DG" to the number of drop goals kicked and "Pts" refer to the total number of points scored by the player.

Referees

The following referees officiated matches in the 2019 Currie Cup First Division:

See also

 2019 Currie Cup Premier Division
 2019 Rugby Challenge

References

External links
 SARU website

2019 Currie Cup
2019
Currie Cup
Currie Cup